Komorów  is a village in the administrative district of Gmina Pacanów, within Busko County, Świętokrzyskie Voivodeship, in southern Poland.

The village has a population of 389.

During the January Uprising, on 20 June 1863, it was the site of the Battle of Komorów between Polish insurgents and Russian troops.

References

Villages in Busko County